The 2013–14 Brisbane Roar FC W-League season was the club's sixth participation in the W-League, since the league's formation in 2008.

Season overview

Players

Squad information

Transfers

In

Out

Competitions

Overall

W-League

Pre-season

Regular season

Finals series

Statistics

Results summary

Ladder

Results by round

Squad statistics

Disciplinary record
Correct as of 10 February 2014

League goalscorers per round

Awards
 Player of the Week (Round 4) – Katrina Gorry
 2013 FIFA World Player of the Year – Nadine Angerer
 Player of the Week (Round 12) – Elise Kellond-Knight

References

External links
 Official website

Brisbane Roar FC (A-League Women) seasons
Brisbane